"Cover Me" is a song written and performed by American rock singer Bruce Springsteen. It was the second single released from his 1984 album Born in the U.S.A.. Springsteen wrote the song for Donna Summer. However, his manager, Jon Landau, decided the song had hit potential, and so he kept it for the upcoming Springsteen album. It has been certified Gold in the US.

History
The song was recorded on January 25, 1982, at the Hit Factory, during the first wave of the Born in the U.S.A. sessions. At the time, the song was originally suggested for Donna Summer, but rejected by Jon Landau in favor of "Protection" (another song written by Springsteen). An unreleased "outtake" of the song, titled "Drop On Down and Cover Me", has long been considered a precursor to the officially released "Cover Me", but was actually recorded in June 1983.

Cash Box called the song "a driving, emotional display of classic Boss."

The song peaked at #7 on the Billboard Hot 100 singles charts in October 1984. It was the second of a record-tying seven Top 10 hit singles to be released from Born in the U.S.A.

No music video was made for the song.

Charts and certifications

Weekly charts

Year-end charts

Certifications

Remixes
Continuing the club play goal started with "Dancing in the Dark", Arthur Baker created the 12-inch "Undercover Mix" of "Cover Me". This was a large-scale transformation: a new bass line was cut, an unused backing vocal by industry legend Jocelyn Brown was restored, and reggae and dub elements were introduced. It was released on October 15, 1984.

As with the previous effort, the result displeased some of Springsteen's more strait-laced fans, but did gain actual club play: the remix went to number 11 on Billboard's Hot Dance/Disco chart.

Track listings

7-inch single
"Cover Me" – 3:26
"Jersey Girl" – 6:15 with an edited spoken introduction, or at 6:10 without a spoken introduction.

The B-side of the single, "Jersey Girl", was a live performance of a Tom Waits song, recorded on July 9, 1981, at Meadowlands Arena.  Springsteen had introduced the song earlier in that special River Tour homecoming stand that opened the arena, slightly rewriting it to replace a Waits line about "whores on Eighth Avenue" and adding a verse that included "that little brat of yours and drop[ping] her off at your mom's." "Jersey Girl" would become a Springsteen fan favorite, although played rarely as time went on. This same recording would later be released as the closing track of Live 1975-85.

Differing pressings of the single had different lengths of "Jersey Girl", sometimes dropping most of a spoken introduction of 0:31 seconds in length. The UK 12-inch single contains the full-length version with the complete spoken introduction at 6:36. Both the sleeve and label erroneously state a playing time of 5:50.

12-inch single
"Cover Me" (Undercover Mix) – 6:09
"Cover Me" (Dub 1) – 4:02
"Cover Me" (Radio Mix) – 3:46
"Cover Me" (Dub 2) – 4:15

CD single (1988)
"Cover Me" – 3:26
"Pink Cadillac" – 3:33

Live performance history
Springsteen was unsure of how to play "Cover Me" in concert, and initially it appeared irregularly in the 1984–1985 Born in the U.S.A. Tour.  Then, inspired by Arthur Baker's remix, he rearranged it to open and close with a quiet, ominous, extended, echoing segment as new E Street backup singer Patti Scialfa wailed a snippet of Martha & the Vandellas' "Nowhere to Run" (in her one spotlight role of the show) while her future husband reverbed "Cuh ... vuh ... me-ee-ee", after which the song ramped up into showcase guitar work for Springsteen and Nils Lofgren.  "Cover Me" thus became a featured song on the tour, often opening the second set; such a performance was included on the 1986 Live 1975–85.

"Cover Me" continued as a regular selection on the 1988 Tunnel of Love Express and Human Rights Now! Tours, and the 1992 leg of the "Other Band" Tour (now without Scialfa's part).  After December 1992 it was dropped until Springsteen's first concert in Oslo on July 7, 2008, and most recently in Philadelphia on October 20, 2009.  The song has been performed 300 times through 2008. The song has turned up as a semi-regular on the Working On A Dream Tour, especially after Springsteen and the E Street Band began playing the entire Born in the U.S.A. album in New York and Philadelphia.

For his tours between 2002 and 2017, many of the set lists have been published on his official website, Brucespringsteen.net. Of these, all of the singer's performances of the song are listed in the table below.

Personnel
According to authors Philippe Margotin and Jean-Michel Guesdon:

Bruce Springsteen – vocals, guitars
Roy Bittan – piano
Clarence Clemons – maracas
Danny Federici – organ
Garry Tallent – bass
Max Weinberg – drums
Richie Rosenberg – backing vocals

Notes

Footnotes

References

 Born in the U.S.A. The World Tour (tour booklet, 1985), Tour chronology.
 
 
 
 
 
 
 
 
 
 
 
 
 
 

Bruce Springsteen songs
1984 singles
Songs written by Bruce Springsteen
Song recordings produced by Jon Landau
Columbia Records singles
1984 songs
Song recordings produced by Bruce Springsteen
Song recordings produced by Steven Van Zandt
Song recordings produced by Chuck Plotkin